Ceredigion is a constituency of the Senedd. It elects one Member of the Senedd by the first past the post method of election. It is also one of eight constituencies in the Mid and West Wales electoral region, which elects four additional members, in addition to eight constituency members, to produce a degree of proportional representation for the region as a whole.

It has been represented since its creation in 1999 by Plaid Cymru's Elin Jones, who has also been the Llywydd (Presiding Officer) of the Senedd since 2016.

Boundaries 

The area of the constituency is similar to that of the county of Ceredigion.

1999 to 2007 
The constituency was created for the first election to the Assembly, in 1999, with the name and boundaries of the Ceredigion Westminster constituency. It is a Dyfed constituency, one of five constituencies covering, and entirely within, the preserved county of Dyfed.

The other four Dyfed constituencies are Carmarthen East and Dinefwr, Carmarthen West and South Pembrokeshire, Llanelli and Preseli Pembrokeshire. They are all within the Mid and West Wales electoral region.

The region consisted of the eight constituencies of Brecon and Radnorshire, Carmarthen East and Dinefwr, Carmarthen West and South Pembrokeshire, Ceredigion, Llanelli, Meirionnydd Nant Conwy, Montgomeryshire and Preseli Pembrokeshire.

From 2007 
Boundaries changed for the 2007 Assembly election. Ceredigion remained one of five Dyfed constituencies and one of eight constituencies in the Mid and West Wales region. 
However, boundaries within Dyfed changed, to realign them with local government ward boundaries and to reduce disparities in the sizes of constituency electorates, and the boundaries of the region changed, to align them with the boundaries of preserved counties.

The other four Dyfed constituencies are, again, Carmarthen West and South Pembrokeshire, Carmarthen East and Dinefwr, Llanelli and Preseli Pembrokeshire. They are all within the Mid and West Wales electoral region.

The region consists of the constituencies of Brecon and Radnorshire, Carmarthen East and Dinefwr, Carmarthen West and South Pembrokeshire, Ceredigion, Dwyfor Meirionnydd, Llanelli, Montgomeryshire and Preseli Pembrokeshire.

For Westminster purposes, the same new constituency boundaries became effective for the 2010 United Kingdom general election.

Voting
In general elections for the Senedd, each voter has two votes. The first vote may be used to vote for a candidate to become the Member of the Senedd for the voter's constituency, elected by the first past the post system. The second vote may be used to vote for a regional closed party list of candidates. Additional member seats are allocated from the lists by the d'Hondt method, with constituency results being taken into account in the allocation.

Members of the Senedd

Elections

Elections in the 2020s

Elections in the 2010s 

Regional ballots rejected: 187

Elections in the 2000s 

2003 Electorate: 52,940
Regional ballots rejected: 189

Elections in the 1990s

References 

Senedd constituencies in the Mid and West Wales electoral region
Elections in Ceredigion
1999 establishments in Wales
Constituencies established in 1999
Politics of Ceredigion